St. Brendan's Hospital may refer to:

 St Brendan's Hospital, Castlebay, a hospital in the Outer Hebrides
 St. Brendan's Hospital (Grangegorman), a psychiatric facility in north Dublin, Ireland